Nathan Radford Sturgis (born July 6, 1987) is an American former soccer player who last played for Seattle Sounders FC in Major League Soccer.

Career

Youth and college
Sturgis attended Nease High School, played club soccer with the First Coast KYX, and played two years of college soccer at Clemson University. In his freshman season in 2004, Sturgis scored three goals and was named to the ACC All-Freshman Team. As a sophomore, Sturgis scored two goals and added seven assists in leading the Tigers to the College Cup. Sturgis was named 3rd Team All-American and ACC Defensive Player of the Year in 2005. Sturgis also played one year with the Ajax Orlando Prospects in the USL Premier Development League

Professional
Sturgis signed a Generation Adidas contract with MLS, and was taken 12th overall in the 2006 MLS SuperDraft by the Los Angeles Galaxy. During Galaxy's pre-season tour of England in 2006 they competed against several high-profile clubs, including (then) English Premiership Champions Chelsea, and Sturgis was picked out by the staff at Chelsea and other English teams as the outstanding player of the tour. On June 21, 2007, Sturgis was traded, along with forward Robbie Findley, to Real Salt Lake in exchange for veteran midfielder Chris Klein.

On November 26, 2008, he was selected by Seattle Sounders FC in the second round of the 2008 MLS Expansion Draft. On September 18, 2010, Sturgis scored his first professional goal in a 4–0 win at Columbus against the Columbus Crew. His goal came from the penalty spot.

On November 24, 2010, Sturgis was selected by Vancouver Whitecaps FC in the third round of the 2010 MLS Expansion Draft. The next day Nathan was traded by Vancouver to Toronto FC in exchange for a first-round pick in the 2011 MLS SuperDraft.

Sturgis made his debut for Toronto on March 19, 2011, vs. Vancouver in the first-ever all-Canadian MLS match-up, it ended as a 4–2 away loss for Toronto.

On December 28, 2011, Sturgis was traded to Houston Dynamo in exchange for a conditional 2014 MLS SuperDraft pick.

On December 22, 2012, Sturgis was once again on the move when he was traded to Colorado Rapids as part of a deal involving Omar Cummings and allocation money.

After 18 months with Colorado, Sturgis was traded to Chivas USA on July 1, 2014, in exchange for Carlos Alvarez. At the conclusion of the 2014 season, MLS contracted the Chivas USA franchise. Sturgis was available to other clubs in the 2014 MLS Dispersal Draft but was not selected. He then entered the 2014 MLS Re-Entry Draft and was selected by Houston Dynamo in stage two of the draft held on December 18, 2014.

Sturgis returned to Seattle Sounders FC on February 23, 2016, when it was announced that he had signed with them as a free agent.  His option was declined on December 12, 2016, making him a free agent.

International
Sturgis has played for various youth United States national teams, and was part of the Under-20 team at the 2005 World Youth Championship and the 2007 FIFA U-20 World Cup. On July 17, 2008, he was named to the U.S. team that participated in the 2008 Beijing Olympics; however, he was ruled out shortly afterwards due to a hamstring injury.

Career statistics

Honors

Club
Seattle Sounders FC
 Lamar Hunt U.S. Open Cup (2): 2009, 2010

Toronto FC
 Canadian Championship (1): 2011

Personal life 
Sturgis' younger brother, Caleb, is a place kicker who is currently a free agent in the National Football League. His father, Smiley Sturgis, is a pastor.

References

External links
 

1987 births
Living people
American soccer players
American expatriate soccer players
Clemson Tigers men's soccer players
Ajax Orlando Prospects players
LA Galaxy players
Real Salt Lake players
Seattle Sounders FC players
Toronto FC players
Houston Dynamo FC players
Colorado Rapids players
Chivas USA players
Tacoma Defiance players
USL League Two players
Major League Soccer players
USL Championship players
Soccer players from Florida
People from St. Augustine, Florida
Expatriate soccer players in Canada
LA Galaxy draft picks
United States men's youth international soccer players
United States men's under-20 international soccer players
United States men's under-23 international soccer players
Association football midfielders
Association football defenders